In computing, a skin (also known as visual styles in Windows XP) is a custom graphical appearance preset package achieved by the use of a graphical user interface (GUI) that can be applied to specific computer software, operating system, and websites to suit the purpose, topic, or tastes of different users. As such, a skin can completely change the look and feel and navigation interface of a piece of application software or operating system.

Software that is capable of having a skin applied is referred to as being skinnable, and the process of writing or applying such a skin is known as skinning. Applying a skin changes a piece of software's look and feel—some skins merely make the program more aesthetically pleasing, but others can rearrange elements of the interface, potentially making the program easier to use.

Common skinnable applications
The most popular skins are for instant messaging clients, media center, and media player software, such as Trillian and Winamp, due to the association with fun that such programs try to encourage.

Standard interface
Some platforms support changing the standard interface, including most using the X Window System. For those that do not, programs can add the functionality, like WindowBlinds for Microsoft Windows and ShapeShifter for macOS.

Model–view–controller

Skinning is typically implemented with a model–view–controller architecture, which allows for a flexible structure in which the interface is independent from and indirectly linked to application functionality, so the GUI can be easily customized. This allows the user to select or design a different skin at will, and also allows for more deep changes in the position and function of the interface elements.

Disadvantages and benefits

The benefit of skinning in user interfaces is disputed. While some find it useful or pleasant to be able to change the appearance of software, a changed appearance can complicate technical support and training. A user interface that has been extensively customized by one person may appear completely unfamiliar to another who knows the software under a different appearance. Some usability practitioners feel that this flexibility requires interaction design expertise that users might not have.

Websites
Many websites are skinnable, particularly those that provide social capabilities. Some sites provide skins that make primarily cosmetic changes, while some—such as H2G2—offer skins that make major changes to page layout. As with standalone software interfaces, this is facilitated by the underlying technology of the website—XML and XSLT, for instance, facilitate major changes of layout, while CSS can easily produce different visual styles.

Video gaming 
In video games, the term "skin" is similarly used to refer to an in-game character or cosmetic options for a player's character and other in-game items, which can range from different color schemes, to more elaborate designs and costumes. Skins are often awarded as unlockable content for completing specific in-game goals or milestones. Skins can sometimes include historical incarnations of the player character (such as Insomniac Games' Spider-Man, which includes unlockable skins based on Spider-Man's past comic book and film appearances), as well as crossovers with other video games (such as Final Fantasy XIII-2 offering a costume based on Ezio Auditore from the Assassin's Creed franchise, and Super Smash Bros. Ultimate offering costume items based on other video game characters for its customizable Mii Fighter characters). Fortnite Battle Royale has similarly featured extensive uses of licensed properties as the basis for skins, also including non-gaming properties such as comic book characters, the National Football League, and musicians.

Skins are sometimes distributed as part of downloadable content, and as pre-order incentives for newly-released games. In the 2010s, skins were increasingly deemed a virtual good as part of monetization strategies, especially within free-to-play games and those otherwise treated as a service. Via microtransactions commonly known as "loot boxes", a player can earn a random selection of in-game items, which may include skins and other cosmetic items of varying rarity. While often defended as being similar in practice to booster packs for collectible card games, researchers have deemed loot boxes to be "psychologically akin to gambling", and their inclusion in full-priced games have faced criticism from players for being an anti-consumer practice. They have largely been supplanted by "battle passes", which are collections of in-game challenges and goals that unlock reward tiers over a short- or long-term period.

Via the Steam platform, Counter-Strike: Global Offensive and Team Fortress 2 also allow players to trade these items, which has led to communities devoted to bartering them for real-world money, as well as gambling.

See also
Theme (computing)
Computer wallpaper
Look and feel
User interface engineering
Industrial design
Windows Aero
Windows XP visual styles

References

Graphical user interfaces
Software add-ons